21st Circuitry Shox is a various artists compilation album released on July 16, 1996, by 21st Circuitry.

Reception
Aiding & Abetting was enthusiastic towards 21st Circuitry Shox and said "if you haven't gotten acquainted with 21st Circuitry and want to delve into the more conceptual realm of industrial dance music, then by all means apply here." Tom Schulte of allmusic awarded the compilation three out of five stars and described it as "fun and a real history lesson to listen to." Sonic Boom also gave the album a positive review, saying "the entire compilation is an exceedingly strong collection of tracks well worth the price of admission."

Track listing

Personnel
Adapted from the 21st Circuitry Shox liner notes.

 tara ntula – cover art, design

Release history

References

External links 
 

1996 compilation albums
Electronic body music compilation albums
Industrial rock compilation albums
21st Circuitry compilation albums